Glenden Enterprises is an American professional stock car racing team which has competed in the NASCAR Gander RV & Outdoors Truck Series. The team is owned by Chris Fontaine, and he's fielded the No. 47 Toyota Tundra for himself in select superspeedway races.

Gander Outdoors Truck Series

Truck No. 45 history 
Fontaine debuted with this number at Eldora Speedway in 2015, finishing 16th. (Christopher Long is listed as the owner for that race.) Fontaine returned with it at Talladega, where he turned in an eighth-place finish.

Truck No. 47 History 
Chris Fontaine attempted the 2017 NextEra Energy Resources 250 in this number, failing to qualify for the race. Fontaine ran the No. 47 again at Talladega, finishing 26th after an accident on lap 70. Fontaine ran the No. 47 again in 2018 and 2019.

Truck No. 78 History 
This number first showed up at Daytona in 2016, as Fontaine crashed out five laps from the end. Two races later, he failed to qualify with this number at Martinsville Speedway.

Truck No. 83 history 
Brandon Duchscherer ran this truck in one race in 2009, at O'Reilly Raceway Park. However, he retired with overheating after twelve laps in the first race that Glenden Enterprises fielded two trucks. Team owner Fontaine attempted one race with this number in 2012, at Texas Motor Speedway when Russ Dugger was in the 84. However, he failed to qualify.

Truck No. 84 history 
Fontaine ran this truck in Glenden Enterprises' debut races, the 2009 Kroger 250. He finished 20th, one lap down. The truck ran in seven more races that year, all with Fontaine. He recorded a best finish of 13th in the Copart 200, and finished all but one race. In 2010, Fontaine ran seven races with this truck, scoring a best finish of 13th at Chicagoland Speedway. He failed to finish at Talladega when ignition problems made him retire just three laps from the finish. That race was also the first race that a Glenden Enterprises driver had led a lap, as Fontaine paced the field for 15 circuits. 2011 brought a litany of mishaps for the team, as Fontaine only finished two of the six races he ran in the No. 84. Wrecks ended his day at Daytona and Talladega. Then, in the midst of the start and park boom, he did just that for two races, finishing 33rd at Kentucky Speedway and 27th at Pocono Raceway. The two races that Fontaine was running at the end were at Atlanta Motor Speedway, with a 27th-place finish, and at Charlotte Motor Speedway, with an 18th-place finish. In 2012, the team competed in the majority of the races on the schedule, with Fontaine driving fifteen, Russ Dugger driving two, and Wayne Edwards, B. J. McLeod, and Mario Gosselin running one race apiece. The team started off with a bang, with Fontaine scoring the team's first top ten finish, a seventh, at Daytona. He continued to drive until  McLeod drove at Texas, finishing 23rd. The next driver other than Fontaine to drive was Dugger, who drove the truck at Bristol. Fontaine took over for one race but then handed it off to Edwards, who drove home 24th at Iowa. Fontaine then returned to the truck, and he drove four more races until Dugger drove the truck at Texas. Rear gear problems forced him to retire early in that race. Team owner Fontaine also start and parked for two races, before Gosselin drove the final race at Homestead-Miami. He finished 21st in the race, two laps down. In 2013, Fontaine scaled back to just restrictor plate races, crashing out at Daytona and finishing 15th at Talladega. Running the same schedule in 2014, Fontaine tied his best finish of seventh at 'Dega. The season-opening NextEra Energy Resources 250 at Daytona in 2015 was run with the 84, but a crash relegated him to 25th.

References 

American auto racing teams
Auto racing teams established in 2009
NASCAR teams